The UEFA play-offs of the 2019 FIFA Women's World Cup qualification competition involve the four runners-up with the best records among all seven groups in the qualifying group stage.

Ranking of second-placed teams
To determine the four best second-placed teams from the qualifying group stage which advance to the play-offs, only the results of the second-placed teams against the first, third and fourth-placed teams in their group are taken into account, while results against the fifth-placed team are not included. As a result, six matches played by each second-placed team will count for the purposes of determining the ranking.

Draw

The draw for the play-offs was held on 7 September 2018, 14:00 CEST (UTC+2), at the UEFA headquarters in Nyon, Switzerland. The four teams were drawn into two knockout rounds (semi-finals and final) of home-and-away two-legged format.

For the semi-finals, two teams were seeded and two teams were unseeded, based on their latest coefficient ranking after the completion of the qualifying group stage, calculated based on the following:
2015 FIFA Women's World Cup final tournament and qualifying competition (20%)
UEFA Women's Euro 2017 qualifying competition (40%)
2019 FIFA Women's World Cup qualifying competition (preliminary round and group stage) (40%)

For each semi-final, a seeded team was drawn against an unseeded team, with the order of legs decided by draw. A draw was also held for the final between the two winners of the semi-finals to decide the order of legs.

Bracket

The play-off final winner qualifies for the 2019 FIFA Women's World Cup.

Play-off semi-finals

Overview
All times are CEST (UTC+2), as listed by UEFA.

|}

Matches

Netherlands won 4–1 on aggregate.

3–3 on aggregate. Switzerland won on away goals.

Play-off final

Overview

The winner Netherlands qualifies for the 2019 FIFA Women's World Cup.
All times are CET (UTC+1), as listed by UEFA.

|}

Matches

Netherlands won 4–1 on aggregate.

Goalscorers

References

External links
FIFA Women's World Cup Matches: 2017–19 qualifying, UEFA.com

Play-offs
FIFA Women's World Cup qualification - UEFA play-offs
FIFA Women's World Cup qualification - UEFA play-offs
Netherlands at the 2019 FIFA Women's World Cup